Ice Dam Guys, LLC is a nationwide ice dam removal company based out of Minneapolis, Minnesota.

History 
Minneapolis-based Palumbo Services, is the parent company of Ice Dam Guys and has been in operation since 1996.

Ice Dam Guys operates throughout the contiguous United States including in Oregon, Idaho, Illinois, and Massachusetts.

References

External links 
 Official Website

Companies based in Minneapolis
Companies established in 1996